Sing Along with Los Straitjackets is the fourth studio album by American instrumental rock band Los Straitjackets. It was released on September 25, 2001, by Yep Roc Records.

Contrary to their instrumental work of previous and subsequent years, Sing Along with... contains vocal contributions from singers on thirteen cover versions, including Big Sandy (of Big Sandy & His Fly-Rite Boys), Raul Malo (of The Mavericks) and Mike Campbell (of Tom Petty and the Heartbreakers).

Track listing

Personnel
Los Straitjackets
Danny Amis – guitar, production
Eddie Angel – guitar, production
Pete Curry – bass, production
Jimmy Lester – drums, percussion, production
Guest musicians
Nick Lowe – bass on "Shake That Rat"
Mark Lindsay – saxophone on "Treat Her Right"
Chris Carmichael –  string section, string arrangement
Additional personnel
R. S. Field – production
Mark Linett – production, engineering, mastering
Jake Guralnik – executive production
Jim DeMain – engineering, mastering
Johnny Bartlett – artwork, design
Bill Crump – photography

References

Los Straitjackets albums
2001 albums
Yep Roc Records albums
Covers albums